Emir Karic (born 9 June 1997) is an Austrian professional footballer who plays as a left-back for Darmstadt 98.

Club career
Karic made his Austrian Football First League debut for LASK Linz on 22 May 2015 in a game against FC Wacker Innsbruck.

Personal life
Born in Austria, Karic is of Bosnian descent.

References

External links
 

1997 births
Footballers from Linz
Living people
Austrian footballers
Association football fullbacks
Austria youth international footballers
Austria under-21 international footballers
Austrian people of Bosnia and Herzegovina descent
Austrian Football Bundesliga players
2. Liga (Austria) players
2. Bundesliga players
LASK players
FC Liefering players
SC Rheindorf Altach players
SV Darmstadt 98 players
Austrian expatriate footballers
Austrian expatriate sportspeople in Germany
Expatriate footballers in Germany